Ą (minuscule: ą) is a letter in the Polish, Kashubian, Lithuanian, Creek, Navajo, Western Apache, Chiricahua, Osage, Hocąk, Mescalero, Gwich'in, Tutchone, and Elfdalian alphabets. It is formed from the letter a and an ogonek and usually, except for modern Lithuanian and Polish, denotes a nasal a sound.

Polish 
In the Polish alphabet, ą comes after a, but never appears at the beginning of a word. Originally, ą used to represent a nasal a sound, but in modern times, its pronunciation has shifted to a nasal o sound. The letter does not have one determined pronunciation and instead, its pronunciation is dependent on the sounds it is followed by.

Pronunciation 

History 
Polish ą sound evolved from a long nasal a sound of medieval Polish into a short nasal o sound in the modern language. The medieval vowel, along with its short counterpart, evolved in turn from the merged nasal *ę and *ǫ of Late Proto-Slavic.

Another explanation is connected to the adoption of the Old Czech-style orthography of the Latin alphabet to write Polish at the turn of the 16th century. In Poland-Lithuania, Latin still dominated in writing in the Kingdom of Poland, and the Cyrillic-based vernacular of Ruthenian had been in official use in the Grand Duchy of Lithuania since the 13th century. In pronunciation, the Church Cyrillic letter big yus (Ѫ ѫ) corresponds to the pronunciation of the Polish ą. However, it is little yus (Ѧ ѧ), which is phonetically similar to ę and, more importantly, shares visual resemblances with the Latin alphabet initial letter (A, a) plus an ogonek, that some believe led to ogonek's introduction. This, according to proponents of the theory, resulted in the letter ą for denoting the nasal o, when it logically should have been ǫ rather than ą. When the ogonek had already been in place as the diacritic for marking nasality in vowels, it was appended to e, resulting in ę for nasal e.

Alternations 
 'tooth':  →  ('teeth'),
'snake':  →  ('snakes')
 'husband' in nominative:  →  ('with husband', in instrumental case)
 'weight':  →  ('to weigh down, to be a burden'),
'month':  →  ('monthly'),
'a judge':  →  ('to judge, think')
 'row' in nominative:  →  ('four times in a row', genitive case)

Lithuanian 
In modern Lithuanian, it is no longer nasal and is now pronounced as a long a. It is the second letter of the Lithuanian alphabet called  (nasal a).

Thus, ą is used to distinguish between the transcription of accusative and the nominative cases of the noun .

It is also used when converting present tense verbs into participles, e.g.,  ( (somebody who is seeing right now).

Finally, some verbs have it in the middle of a word but only in the present tense, e.g., ( (is getting white), but not  (has become white).

The letter can also be found at the beginning of several words, e.g.,   (jug).

The Americas 

In some indigenous languages of the Americas, the letter denotes a nasal a sound:
 Western Apache
 Chiricahua
 Creek
 Gwich'in
 Hochunk
 Mescalero
 Navajo
 Tutchone
 Assiniboine/Nakoda

Elfdalian 

The Elfdalian alphabet contains the letters that occur in the Swedish alphabet as well as various letters with ogonek to denote nasality. Ą and ą denote a nasal a sound.

Reconstructed language

Scholars who have reconstructed the Proto-Germanic language (the ancestor of all modern Germanic languages, spoken c. 500 BC – AD 500) use the letter ą to denote a nasal vowel.

Computing codes

See also 
 Ę
 Ogonek
 Kashubian alphabet
 Lithuanian alphabet
 Elfdalian alphabet
 Polish phonology
 Polish alphabet
 Yus

References 

A-ogonek
Lithuanian language
Polish letters with diacritics